John Wood of Marsden came to Glossop from Manchester in 1819 and bought existing woollen mills which he expanded. These were the Howard Town mills. In 1825, John Wood installed the first steam engine and power looms. The Howardtown Mills became the largest spinning weaving combine in Glossop, and with Wren's Nest, and Waterside Mills, Hadfield dominated the Derbyshire cotton industry.

References

Mill owners in Glossop
English industrialists
19th-century English businesspeople
Year of birth missing
Year of death missing